The University of Florida College of the Arts is the fine arts college of the University of Florida.  The college was established in 1975, and is located on the university's Gainesville, Florida campus.  The current dean is Onye P. Ozuzu.

Previously named the College of Fine Arts, the college's name was changed on May 12, 2014, citing Dean Lucinda Lavelli's statement: "We have been considering this transition for several years and believe that the College of the Arts is more encompassing of the extensive activities and offerings of our college. We have vibrant visual and performing arts programs, and the term 'Fine' no longer holds the
same currency that it did when our college was established."

The College of the Arts is one of 16 colleges and more than 150 research centers and institutes at the University of Florida.  The College of the Arts offers bachelor's, master's and Ph.D. degree programs in its three fully accredited schools — the School of Art and Art History, School of Music, and School of Theatre and Dance.  The college is also the home to the Center for Arts in Medicine, Center for World Arts, Digital Worlds Institute, University Galleries and the New World School of the Arts in Miami. More than 100 faculty members and more than 1,220 students work together daily to engage, inspire and create. The college hosts more than 300 performances, exhibitions and events each year. Faculty and students also exhibit and perform at other local, national and international venues.

Composition
The college is composed of three schools:
 School of Art and Art History
 Director: Elizabeth Ross
 School of Music
 Director:  Kevin Robert Orr
 School of Theatre and Dance
 Director: Peter Carpenter

Also included are
 Center for Arts in Medicine
 Center for Arts, Migration, and Entrepreneurship
 Digital Worlds Institute
 University Galleries: Gary R. Libby University Gallery, Grinter Gallery, Gary R. Libby Focus Gallery
 New World School of the Arts (Miami)

Facilities

The college holds classes mainly in the Fine Arts Buildings (lettered A through D) and in the Music Building. There is also a warehouse off-campus located on University Avenue used for shows and as the classroom for the Workshop for Art Research and Practices (WARP), an "Art Bootcamp" for freshmen. In 2004, the Nadine McGuire Theatre and Dance Pavilion became the home for School of Theatre + Dance faculty and students.

The college also extends in the University Galleries—the Gary R. Libby University Gallery, Grinter Gallery, Gary R. Libby Focus Gallery, and has collections in the Architecture and Fine Arts Library, Music Library, Belknap Collection for the Performing Arts (West), Education Library (Norman Hall), and the Visual Resources Center.

The School of Music and the School of Theater and Dance regularly use the University Auditorium for performances, and the playing of the carillon in Century Tower is under the purview of the School of Music, as well.

See also
 Theatre Strike Force
 Roy C. Craven, founding director of the University Gallery at UF

References

External links
 College of the Arts official website
 SA+AH official website
 School of Music official website
 School of Theater and Dance official website
 Center for Arts in Medicine official website
 Center for the Arts and Public Policy official website
 Center for World Arts official website
 University Galleries official website
 Digital Worlds Institute official website
 UF Performing Arts official website
 New World School of the Arts official website
 Gainesville Sun info about the College

Fine Arts
Educational institutions established in 1975
Art schools in Florida
1975 establishments in Florida